Halmstads BK participated in 2006 in Allsvenskan and Svenska Cupen.

2006 season squad
The 2006 season squad.
Statistics prior to season start only

Transfers

In

Out

Fixtures and results

Allsvenskan

League table

League fixtures and results

References
Footnotes

References

External links
 Halmstads BK homepage
 Allsvenskan 2006 season SvFF homepage 

Halmstads BK seasons
Halmstad